Jean-Pierre Cassel (born Jean-Pierre Crochon; 27 October 1932 – 19 April 2007) was a French actor.

Early life
Cassel was born Jean-Pierre Crochon in the 13th arrondissement of Paris, the son of Louise-Marguerite (née Fabrègue), an opera singer, and Georges Crochon, a doctor. Cassel was discovered by Gene Kelly as he tap danced on stage, and later cast in the 1957 film The Happy Road.

Career
Cassel gained prominence in the late 1950s as a hero in comedies by Philippe de Broca such as Male Companion and through his role as 'Jean François Jardie' in the famous French resistance piece L' Armée des ombres.

During the 1960s and 1970s, he worked with Claude Chabrol (The Breach), Luis Buñuel (as Stéphane Audran's husband in The Discreet Charm of the Bourgeoisie 1972), Ken Annakin (as the Frenchman in Those Magnificent Men in Their Flying Machines 1965), Gérard Brach (as Claude Jade's lover in The Boat on the Grass), Richard Lester (as Louis XIII of France in The Three Musketeers 1973 and its sequel The Four Musketeers 1974), Sidney Lumet (as Pierre in Murder on the Orient Express) and Joseph Losey (with Isabelle Huppert in The Trout). He also made an appearance in Oh! What a Lovely War as a French military officer singing 'Belgium put the Kibosh on the Kaiser'. In later years, he appeared in Robert Altman's Prêt-à-Porter (1994) and also as Dr. Paul Gachet for Vincent & Theo (1990).

In 2006, at the age of 74, he returned to the stage for a retrospective of Serge Gainsbourg, Jean-Pierre Cassel chante et danse Gainsbourg Suite. This homage to an old friend (he knew Gainsbourg in the 1950s) featured various songs of the French composer among which three unpublished songs named "Top à Cassel" – "Cliquediclac", "Ouh ! Là là là là", and "Viva la pizza" – all of which were intended for a television show aired in 1964.

In 2007, Cassel appeared in dual roles (as Père Lucien and the Lourdes souvenir vendor) in Julian Schnabel's film The Diving Bell and the Butterfly.

During his career, Cassel starred in more than 110 films, fifty stage plays, and many musical theatre performances and television shows.

Personal life
Cassel is the father of Vincent Cassel, Mathias Cassel (also known as Rockin' Squat, leader of the French rap crew Assassin), and Cécile Cassel. He was "very close" to his children and his daughter-in-law, Monica Bellucci.

Death
On 19 April 2007, Cassel died of cancer at age 74.

Selected filmography

 Pigalle-Saint-Germain-des-Prés (1950, directed by André Berthomieu) as Un figurant
 Saluti e baci (1953, directed by Maurice Labro and Giorgio Simonelli) (uncredited)
 Act of Love (1953, directed by Anatole Litvak) as Un danseur (uncredited)
 La Famille Anodin (1956, TV Series) as Jean Lou Anodin
 The Happy Road (1957, directed by Gene Kelly) as Young lover at the Guinguette (uncredited)
 Comme un cheveu sur la soupe (1957, directed by Maurice Régamey) as Un journaliste (uncredited)
 La peau de l'ours (1957, directed by Claude Boissol) as Le fils Duquenne
 On Foot, on Horse, and on Wheels (1957, directed by Maurice Delbez) as Mariel
 Le désordre et la nuit (1958, directed by Gilles Grangier) as Un jeune militaire (uncredited)
 Sacrée jeunesse (1958, directed by André Berthomieu) as Un jeune dans la boîte (uncredited)
 In Case of Adversity (1958, directed by Claude Autant-Lara) as Le trompettiste (uncredited)
 And Your Sister? (1958, directed by Maurice Delbez) (uncredited)
 La Marraine de Charley (1959, directed by Pierre Chevalier) as Claude
 The Love Game (1960, directed by Philippe de Broca) as Victor
 The Joker (1960, directed by Philippe de Broca) as Édouard Berlon
 Candide ou l'optimisme au XXe siècle (1960, directed by Norbert Carbonnaux) as Candide
 Five Day Lover (1961, directed by Philippe de Broca) as Antoine
 Goodbye Again (1961, directed by Anatole Litvak, Cameo) as Dancer (uncredited)
 Napoleon II, the Eagle (1961, directed by Claude Boissol) as Gustav von Neipperg
 The Dance (1962, directed by Norbert Carbonnaux) as Albert
 The Seven Deadly Sins (1962) as Raymond (segment "Avarice, L'")
 The Elusive Corporal (1962, directed by Jean Renoir) as Le caporal / The Corporal
  (1962, directed by Édouard Molinaro) as Gérard Dagmar
 High Infidelity (1964) (Anthology film) as Tonino (segment "La Sospirosa")
 Les plus belles escroqueries du monde (1964) (Anthology film) as Alain des Arcys (segment "L'homme qui vendit la Tour Eiffel")
 Cyrano et d'Artagnan (1964, directed by Abel Gance) as Monsieur d'Artagnan, de la Compagnie des Mousquetaires du Roy
 Male Companion (1964, directed by Philippe de Broca) as Antoine Mirliflor
 Nunca pasa nada (1965, directed by Juan Antonio Bardem) as Juan
 Those Magnificent Men in Their Flying Machines (1965, directed by Ken Annakin) as Pierre Dubois
 The Lace Wars (1965, directed by René Clair) as Jolicoeur
 Is Paris Burning? (1966, directed by René Clément) as Lieutenant Henri Karcher
 The Killing Game (1967, directed by Alain Jessua) as Pierre Meyrand
 Anyone Can Play (1968, directed by Luigi Zampa) as Aldo, Luisa's husband
 Oh! What a Lovely War (1969, directed by Richard Attenborough) as French Colonel
 Army of Shadows (1969, directed by Jean-Pierre Melville) as Jean François Jardie
 L'Ours et la Poupée (1970, directed by Michel Deville) as Gaspard
 The Breach (1970, directed by Claude Chabrol) as Paul Thomas
 The Boat on the Grass (1971, directed by Gérard Brach) as David
 Malpertuis (1971, directed by Harry Kümel) as Lampernisse
 The Discreet Charm of the Bourgeoisie (1972, directed by Luis Buñuel) as Henri Sénéchal
 Il magnate (1973, directed by Giovanni Grimaldi) as Gianni
 Baxter! (1973, directed by Lionel Jeffries) as Roger Tunnell
 The Three Musketeers (1973, directed by Richard Lester) as King Louis XIII
 Le Mouton enragé (1974, directed by Michel Deville) as Claude Fabre
 The Four Musketeers (1974, directed by Richard Lester) as Louis XIII
 Murder on the Orient Express (1974, directed by Sidney Lumet) as Pierre
 That Lucky Touch (1975, directed by Christopher Miles) as Leo
 Docteur Françoise Gailland (1976, directed by Jean-Louis Bertucelli) as Daniel Letessier
 Scrambled Eggs (1976, directed by Joël Santoni) as Le représentant du dirigeant italien
 The Twist (1976, directed by Claude Chabrol) as Jacques Lavolet, l'éditeur
 Who Is Killing the Great Chefs of Europe? (1978, directed by Ted Kotcheff) as Kohner
 Les Rendez-vous d'Anna (1978, directed by Chantal Akerman) as Daniel
 From Hell to Victory (1979, directed by Umberto Lenzi) as Dick Sanders
 Grandison (1979, directed by Achim Kurz) as Oppenheimer
 Je te tiens, tu me tiens par la barbichette (1979, directed by Jean Yanne) as Jean-Marcel Grumet
 La ville des silences (1979, directed by Jean Marboeuf) as Le privé
 Le soleil en face (1980, directed by Pierre Kast) as Marat
 5% de risque (1980, directed by ) as Henri Tanin
 Love in a Cold Climate (1980, TV Mini-Series) as Fabrice, Duc de Sauveterre
 Superman II (1980, directed by Richard Lester) as French Officer at the White House (uncredited)
 La vie continue (1981, directed by Moshé Mizrahi) as Pierre
 Portrait of a Woman, Nude (1981, directed by Nino Manfredi) as Pireddu
 Alice (1982, directed by Jacek Bromski and ) as Rabbit
 La guérilléra (1982, directed by Pierre Kast) as Coronel Larzac
 The Trout (1982, directed by Joseph Losey) as Rambert
 Ehrengard (1982, directed by Emidio Greco) as Cazotte
 T'es heureuse? Moi, toujours... (1983, directed by Jean Marboeuf) (voice)
 Vive la sociale! (1983, directed by Gérard Mordillat) as Le camelot
 Tranches de vie (1985, directed by François Leterrier) as Le comte de Forcheville
 Vado a riprendermi il gatto (1987, directed by Giuliano Biagetti)
 Chouans! (1988, directed by Philippe de Broca) as Baron de Tiffauges
 Young Toscanini (1988, directed by Franco Zeffirelli) as Comparsa (uncredited)
 Mangeclous (1988, directed by Moshé Mizrahi) as De Surville
 The Return of the Musketeers (1989, directed by Richard Lester) as Cyrano de Bergerac
The Fatal Image (1990 TV Movie) as Vandelle
 Mister Frost (1990, directed by ) as Inspector Corelli
 Vincent & Theo (1990, directed by Robert Altman) as Dr. Paul Gachet
 The Maid (1990, TV Movie, directed by Ian Toynton) as C.P. Olivier
 The Favour, the Watch and the Very Big Fish (1991, directed by Ben Lewin) as Zalman
 Between Heaven and Earth (1992, directed by Marion Hänsel) as Le rédacteur en chef
 Amor e Dedinhos de Pé (1992, directed by Luís Filipe Rocha) as Gonçalo Botelho
 Coup de jeune (1993, directed by Xavier Gélin) as Le ministre
 Pétain (1993, directed by Jean Marbœuf) as Hans Roberto
 Chá Forte com Limão (1993, directed by António de Macedo) as Tiago
 L'oeil écarlate (1993, directed by Dominique Roulet) as Leprince
 Métisse (1993, directed by Mathieu Kassovitz) as Gynecologist
 Hell (1994, directed by Claude Chabrol) as M. Vernon
 Casque bleu (1994, directed by Gérard Jugnot) as Nicolas
 Prêt-à-Porter (1994, directed by Robert Altman) as Olivier de la Fontaine
 La Cérémonie (1995, directed by Claude Chabrol) as Georges Lelievre
 Tatort (1995, German TV-series, Episode: "Camerone") as Bruno Dupeyron
 Amores que matan (1996, directed by Juan Manuel Chumilla-Carbajosa) as André
 Les Bidochon  (1996, directed by Serge Korber) as Le PDG de Canal B
 Con rabbia e con amore (1997, directed by Alfredo Angeli) as Gigi
 The Ice Rink (1998, directed by Jean-Philippe Toussaint) as Ice Rink's Manager
 Trafic d'influence (1999, directed by Dominique Farrugia) as Pierre-Jean Guisard
 Le plus beau pays du monde (1999, directed by Marcel Bluwal) as Blondel
 Sade (2000, directed by Benoît Jacquot) as Le vicomte de Lancris
 The Crimson Rivers (2000, directed by Mathieu Kassovitz) as Dr. Bernard Chernezé
 The Wooden Camera (2003, directed by Ntshavheni Wa Luruli) as Mr. Shawn
 Michel Vaillant (2003, directed by ) as Henri Vaillant
 Dans tes rêves (2005, directed by Denis Thybaud) as Mike
 Virgil (2005, directed by Mabrouk El Mechri) as Ernest
 Bunker paradise (2005, directed by Stefan Liberski) as Henri Devaux
 Congorama (2006, directed by Philippe Falardeau) as Hervé Roy
 Call Me Agostino (2006, directed by Christine Laurent) as Adrien Beaudessin
 Fair Play (2006, directed by Lionel Bailliu) as Édouard
 Mauvaise foi (2006, directed by Roschdy Zem) as Victor Breitmann
 Où avais-je la tête? (2007, directed by Nathalie Donnini) as Albert
 Contre-enquête (2007, directed by Franck Mancuso) as Le docteur Delmas
 J'aurais voulu être un Danseur (2007, directed by Alain Berliner) as Guy adulte
 The Diving Bell and the Butterfly (2007, directed by Julian Schnabel) as Père Lucien et le Vendeur
 Vous êtes de la police ? (2007, directed by Romuald Beugnon) as Simon Sablonnet
 Asterix at the Olympic Games'' (2008, directed by Thomas Langmann and Frédéric Forestier) as Panoramix (final film role)

References

External links

 Le coin du cinéphage

1932 births
2007 deaths
20th-century French male actors
21st-century French male actors
French male film actors
French male stage actors
French male television actors
Male actors from Paris